Petr Kovačka (born 23 December 1971) is a former professional tennis player from the Czech Republic. He used to coach Barbora Krejčíková.

Biography
Kovačka toured as a doubles specialist and played most of his matches alongside countryman Pavel Kudrnáč. It was partnering Kudrnáč that he qualified for the main draw of the 2000 US Open. They lost in the opening round in straight sets to the Argentine pairing of Gastón Etlis and Sebastián Prieto, the first in a tiebreak and second 4–6. The pair won a total of three Challenger titles together and made the semi-finals of the ATP Tour tournament in San Marino in 2000. He reached his career best doubles ranking in 2000, which was 109 in the world.

Challenger titles

Doubles: (3)

References

External links
 
 

1971 births
Living people
Czech male tennis players